Claude Louise Batho (née Bodier; 1 June 1935 – September 1981) was a French photographer. She is remembered for the detailed images of her home and for her series on Claude Monet's garden at Giverny.

Biography
Born in Chamalières in the Puy-de-Dôme, Batho graduated in photography from the École des arts appliqués in 1956.  She went on to work in the archives at the Bibliothèque nationale de France where she met her husband, John Batho, also a photographer. Her black-and-white photographs, published in Le Moment des Choses, document details of the inside of her home: a broom leaning against a wall, a fading bunch of flowers, her little daughter asleep on the couch, all represented with surprising intensity, evoking a feeling of nostalgia and sadness. Her images of Claude Monet's garden at Giverny, taken in October 1980, shortly before she died, also include glimpses of her family, almost as if their fleeting figures were included by accident. The square-shaped prints contrast sharply with the formats of Monet's own works.

Claude Batho died of cancer when she was only 46.

Works

Exhibitions
1977: Gallerie Agathe Gaillard, Paris
1982: Retrospective at the Musée d'Art Moderne de la Ville de Paris

Examples of Claude Batho's photographs can be seen online at the Centre Pompidou.

References

French women photographers
1935 births
1981 deaths
20th-century French photographers
Artists from Paris
People from Chamalières
Deaths from cancer in France
20th-century French women artists
20th-century women photographers